The 1934 Arkansas State Indians football team represented Arkansas State College—now known as Arkansas State University—as a member of the Arkansas Intercollegiate Conference (AIC) during the 1934 college football season. Led by first-year Elza T. Renfro in his first and only season as head coach, the Indians compiled an overall record of 2–4–2 with a mark of 1–3–1 in conference play. Arkansas State played home games at Kays Field in Jonesboro, Arkansas.

Schedule

References

Arkansas State
Arkansas State Red Wolves football seasons
Arkansas State Indians football